Emporio or Emporeio, also known as Nimborios, is a village on the island of Santorini, Greece. It is located 12 km from Fira, near the Profitis Ilias Mountains.

According to the 2011 census, the community of Emporio has 3,085 permanent inhabitants. The community consists of the villages Emporeio, Perissa, Agios Georgios and Exomytis.

Among other attractions, Emporio boasts the old Goulas Castle and some churches, such as Saint Nicholas Marmaritis.

References

Emporio

Santorini
Populated places in Thira (regional unit)